PAW Patrol: Grand Prix is a racing video game developed by 3DClouds and published by Outright Games. It is based on the children's television series PAW Patrol, and was released on September 30, 2022, for Microsoft Windows, Nintendo Switch, PlayStation 4, PlayStation 5, Stadia, Xbox One and Xbox Series X|S.

Gameplay 
The game will allow players to race as a single or 4-player race or arena battle of the characters and vehicles on different tracks from Adventure Bay, The Jungle, Jake's Snowboarding Resort and Barkingburg. Characters that are playable in the game are Ryder, Chase, Marshall, Rubble, Rocky, Zuma, Skye, Everest, Tracker and Rex. It also includes controlling option for little kids with auto-acceleration for easy racing around the track and a harder mode for experience racers.

Development and release 
The game was announced in May 2022 and was released on September 30, 2022. Downloadable content titled Race in Barkingburg was released on December 2, 2022. Another, Pup Treat Arena, added a battle arena mode. It released on March 10, 2023.

References

External links

 

2022 video games
Windows games
Xbox One games
Xbox Series X and Series S games
PlayStation 4 games
PlayStation 5 games
Nintendo Switch games
Stadia games
Unreal Engine games
Video games about dogs
Video games about police officers
Video games based on television series
Racing games
Multiplayer and single-player video games
Split-screen multiplayer games
Nick Jr. video games
Outright Games games
3DClouds games